Xiang Hongqiong (born November 1958) is a retired Chinese politician of Miao ethnicity who served as governor of Qiannan Buyei and Miao Autonomous Prefecture from 2011 to 2016. She was investigated by China's top anti-graft agency in March 2022. She was a delegate to the 12th National People's Congress.

Biography
Xiang was born in Yuqing County, Guizhou, in November 1958. She was a sent-down youth in Lushan District of Kaili County (now Kaili City) between November 1974 and February 1977, and then worked at Kaili County Salt Industry Company. After resuming the college entrance examination, in 1979, she was accepted to Guizhou Agricultural College (now Guizhou University). After graduation in 1983, she stayed at the university and taught there.

Xiang joined the Chinese Communist Party (CCP) in July 1982, and got involved in politics in June 2002, when she was appointed vice mayor of Liupanshui. She became director and party branch secretary of Guizhou Meteorological Bureau in June 2008, and served until 2011. In September 2011, she became vice governor of Qiannan Buyei and Miao Autonomous Prefecture, rising to governor in September 2011. She became director of Ethnic and Religious Affairs Committee of the Guizhou Provincial Committee of the Chinese People's Political Consultative Conference in September 2016, serving in the post until her retirement in January 2022.

Downfall
On 17 March 2022, Xiang was put under investigation for alleged "serious violations of discipline and laws" by the Central Commission for Discipline Inspection (CCDI), the party's internal disciplinary body, and the National Supervisory Commission, the highest anti-corruption agency of China. Her predecessor Li Yuecheng was sacked for graft in January 2020.

References

1958 births
Living people
People from Yuqing County
Guizhou University alumni
Northwest A&F University alumni
South China Agricultural University alumni
People's Republic of China politicians from Guizhou
Chinese Communist Party politicians from Guizhou
Delegates to the 12th National People's Congress